Allen John (born 31 August 1987) is a German professional golfer. He is profoundly deaf. He became a professional golfer in 2011 and played on the Challenge Tour in 2012. He was re-instated as an amateur in 2016. He represented Germany at the 2017 Summer Deaflympics when golf was included in the Summer Deaflympics for the first time and competed in the men's individual golf event securing a gold medal. Since 2018, John has returned to the professional ranks.

Career 
John has been playing golf since the age of ten. He also joined the German national golf team despite being deaf in 2003 after playing for various local and regional teams in Germany. He also attended the Georgia State University and claimed the Freshman of the Year award at the University. John emerged as the champion in the men's golf individual competition at the 2017 Summer Deaflympics after claiming his first Deaflympic medal in his maiden appearance at the Deaflympics representing Germany.

John tied for second at the 2018 Porsche European Open, but could not accept his €170,000 prize because of his amateur status.

Amateur wins
2005 German Boys Open

Professional wins (4)

Pro Golf Tour wins (3)

Other wins (1)
2016 Memorial Olivier Barras (as an amateur)

Team appearances
European Boys' Team Championship (representing Germany): 2005
European Youths' Team Championship (representing Germany): 2006
Eisenhower Trophy (representing Germany): 2018
European Amateur Team Championship (representing Germany): 2008, 2009

References

External links 

Profile at Deaflympics

German male golfers
Georgia State Panthers men's golfers
Deaf golfers
German deaf people
Sportspeople from Ludwigshafen
1987 births
Living people